Katie Walker (April 12, 1969) is a British furniture designer well known for combining simple components in her work. Her designs combine the function of the object with a sculptural interpretation of its structure. She works with craft and volume manufacturers and produces specific one-off commissions from a variety of materials.

Education 
She first studied Furniture and Related Product Design at London's Ravensbourne College of Design and Communication and went on to study for an MA in Furniture Design at the Royal College of Art.

Notable work 
As a furniture designer and business person (she runs Katie Walker Furniture), Katie designs pieces for batch production and for one-off commissions. Most of these pieces are made by Katie Walker Furniture.

Selected commissions include:
1993    Public seating for National Heritage, Bushy Park, Teddington
1994    Boardroom, reception and terrace furniture for Parallel Media Group plc, London
1996    Boardroom table and chairs, Prince's Trust headquarters, Regents Park
1998    Seating for Walsall Leather Museum
2000    Reception area seating, South East Arts, Tunbridge Wells
2000    Seating for Worcester City Art Gallery and Museum
2000,02 Public seating for Allied London Properties Ltd. The Swan shopping Centre, Leatherhead and St. Christophers Place, St. Albans
2002    Seating for Hove Museum & Art Gallery
2002    Altar, lectern and candlesticks for St. Nicholas' church, Arundel
2004    Reception desk and retail display for Farnham Crafts Study Centre

Award-winning pieces include:
Ribbon Rocking Chair (winner of the Wesley Barrell Craft Award and both the Wood Awards Furniture and Innovation Awards in 2006)
Weight and See Mirror (the original of which toured the UK with the "One-Tree" Exhibition)
Gallery seating (holder of Guildmark 250 from the Worshipful Company of Furniture Makers)
Eyers Dining Group - a private commission

Exhibitions 
1993	       'Walk don't Walk', street furniture exhibition at Liverpools' 'Visionfest'
1994	The Hannah Peschar Sculpture Garden, Oxted, Surrey
1995, 96, 98	'Decorative Arts Today', Bonhams, London
1995,96,97,98,99,01	'100% Design', London
1996,97	The Garden Gallery, Stockbridge, Hampshire
1996	'Living at Belsay', Belsay Hall, Northumberland
1996, 97	'Design Resolutions', Royal Festival Hall, London
1997	'The Garden', The Harley Gallery, Worksop
1997, 2002, 2004	The Grace Barrand Design Centre, Nutfield, Surrey
1997	'Almost Edible' Six Chapel Row Gallery, Bath
1998	The Hill House, Helensburgh, Scotland
1998	'Katie Walker Furniture' Hove Museum & Art Gallery
1999, 01	A Celebration of Craftsmanship, Cheltenham
2001/ 2002	'onetree': Royal Botanic Garden Edinburgh; Tenants Hall, Tatton Park, Cheshire; Bristol City Art Gallery; the Geffrye Museum, London
2002	Chelsea Crafts Fair, London
2004	'New Member Focus', Contemporary Applied Arts, London
2006	Collect
2006	Origin

References 
"Walker's Way" - Country House, Issue 02, April 2007
"Going for bespoke" - Rebecca Tanquerary, Sunday Times 11 March 2007
"How to spend it, Skinny by Curvaceous" - Sue Webster, Financial Times, 14 Jun 2002
"Rock of Ages" - Sudi Piggott, Fincancial Times, 26 May 2007,
International Design Yearbook, ed. Richard Sapper & Michael Horsham, Abbeville Press Inc., 1998
"The Guild Marks" - Worshipful Company of Furniture Makers, 2005
"One tree" - Garry Olson, Peter Toaig, and Gary Olsen, Merrell Publishers Ltd 2001
"Bespoke" - A Source book of Furniture Designer Makers, Betty Norbury, 2007

Personal life 
Katie is married and has two daughters. She lives in West Sussex, UK.

She is a Fellow of the Royal Society of Arts, A member of Design Nation and a member of Contemporary Applied Arts

External links
Katie Walker Furniture official site

Living people
1969 births
British furniture designers